Benjamin Rabenorolahy (born 21 January 1940 in Morombe – 14 July 2020) was a Malagasy politician and pastor. 
He was the president of the Malagasy Lutheran Church (FLM - Fiangonana Loterana Malagasy) for 16 years before 2004.

He was a member of the Senate of Madagascar for the Northwest Region, and did not represent any party.

He died on 14 July 2020, in Antananarivo during the COVID-19 pandemic in Madagascar.

References

1940 births
2020 deaths
Malagasy Lutherans
Members of the Senate (Madagascar)
Tiako I Madagasikara politicians
People from Atsimo-Andrefana
Deaths from the COVID-19 pandemic in Madagascar